Mycetocola manganoxydans is a Gram-positive, aerobic and non-spore-forming bacterium from the genus Mycetocola which has been isolated from the Taklamakan Desert.

References

External links
Type strain of Mycetocola manganoxydans at BacDive -  the Bacterial Diversity Metadatabase

Microbacteriaceae
Bacteria described in 2012